Rogue state or rogue nation is a term applied to countries perceived to be threaten world peace.

Rogue Nation may also refer to:

 Rogue Nation (book), by Clyde Prestowitz
 Mission: Impossible – Rogue Nation, the fifth instalment of the film series